Sergei Vladimirovich Sharov (born 11 February 1992) is a Russian football midfielder. He plays for FC Spartak Kostroma.

Club career
He made his debut in the Russian Second Division for FC SKA Rostov-on-Don on 26 April 2011 in a game against FC Torpedo Armavir.

He made his Russian Football National League debut for FC Volgar Astrakhan on 19 November 2012 in a game against FC Shinnik Yaroslavl.

References

External links
 
 

1992 births
People from Shakhty
Sportspeople from Rostov Oblast
Living people
Russian footballers
Association football midfielders
FC SKA Rostov-on-Don players
FC Volgar Astrakhan players
FC Angusht Nazran players
FC Chayka Peschanokopskoye players
FC Spartak Kostroma players
Russian First League players
Russian Second League players